David J. Danelo is an American author and lecturer.

Danelo graduated from the U.S. Naval Academy in 1998 and served seven years as an infantry officer in the Marine Corps. In 2004, Captain Danelo served near Fallujah with the First Marine Expeditionary Force as a convoy commander, intelligence officer and provisional executive officer for a rifle company.

After leaving active duty, Danelo wrote two books, both of which received awards from the Military Writers Society of America.

From June 2011 to July 2012, Danelo served as executive director, Office of Policy and Planning, U.S. Customs and Border Protection.

Books 
 Blood Stripes: The Grunt's View of the War in Iraq (Stackpole: 2006); /
 The Border: Exploring the US-Mexican Divide (Stackpole: 2008); /

Political writing
 Compendium of Danelo's published material under the aegis of the FPRI

References
 http://www.fpri.org/contributors/david-danelo

External links

Place of birth missing (living people)
Year of birth missing (living people)
Living people
United States Marine Corps personnel of the Iraq War
American military writers
United States Marines
United States Naval Academy alumni